Minnesota State Highway 121 (MN 121) is a short freeway stub in Minnesota.  It is less than one mile (1.6 km) in length.

Highway 121 runs between Interstate Highway 35W in Richfield and Lyndale Avenue South (County 22) in  Minneapolis where it intersects West 58th Street.  There was one interchange leading to westbound Highway 62, but this has been reconfigured from a freeway-to-freeway configuration into a half-trumpet configuration with signals on Highway 121.

Route description
State Highway 121 serves as a freeway connector stub on the Minneapolis / Richfield boundary line.  The short route connects I-35W, Highway 62, and Lyndale Avenue in South Minneapolis.

The route is located in Hennepin County.

When traveling on I-35W northbound in Richfield, Highway 121 is accessed by the "Highway 62 west / 58th Street " exit.  58th Street is then followed.

History
Before I-35W was completed to downtown Minneapolis, old U.S. Highway 65 briefly took this stub (present day 121) to rejoin its old alignment on Lyndale Avenue South.  A 1961 road map shows I-35W separating from Lyndale Avenue South at about 58th Street, then continuing south along its present alignment in Richfield and south into Bloomington.  Highway 121 was designated on its current alignment in 1979 after I-35W was built along the Crosstown (State Highway 62) and along 2nd Avenue South going into downtown.

Early history

Prior to 1979, State Highway 121 was routed on different alignments on various surface streets in South Minneapolis.  The first alignment of 121 on France Avenue South was signed in 1935 between 50th Street northbound to Excelsior Boulevard.  The route alignment of 121 was changed in 1957, 1969, 1979, and 1988.  The surface streets that 121 had followed throughout these years included France Avenue South, 50th Street, Lyndale Avenue South, and 46th Street.  All are now county marked routes.

Major intersections

References

121
Transportation in Hennepin County, Minnesota
U.S. Route 65